Witold Piotr Wenclewski (14 April 1964 – 28 July 2014) was a Polish footballer. He played in five matches for the Poland national football team from 1987 to 1988.

References

External links
 

1964 births
2014 deaths
Polish footballers
Poland international footballers
Association football defenders
Footballers from Łódź
ŁKS Łódź players
Sokół Pniewy players